Slavia may refer to:

Toponymy
 Slavia, a general term for an area inhabited by Slavs
 Slawiya, one of the tribal centers of early East Slavs
 The medieval name for the Wendish settlement area
 The medieval name for the duchy of Pomerania
 The medieval name for Mecklenburg
 The medieval name for the Rani principality
 A term for the objective of Pan-Slavism of forming a united Slavic state
 Slavia Friulana, a small mountainous region in northeastern Italy
 Slavia, Florida, an unincorporated community in Seminole County

Sports
 SK Slavia Prague, a Czech football club
 SK Slavia Praha (women), football
 Slavia Prague (juniors), a men's junior football club
 BC Slavia Prague, now USK Praha, basketball
 SK Slavia Prague Basketball, basketball
 DHC Slavia Prague, women's handball
 HC Slavia Prague, ice hockey
 RC Slavia Prague, rugby union
 Slavia Sofia (sports club), based in Sofia, Bulgaria
 PFC Slavia Sofia, football
 Slavia Stadium in Sofia
 BC Slavia Sofia, basketball
 HC Slavia Sofia, ice hockey
 FC Slavia Mozyr, a Belarusian football club
 FK Slavia Orlová-Lutyně, a Czech football club
 HK Slávia Partizánske, a Slovakian women's handball club
 Slavia Louňovice, a Czech football club
 Slavia Melbourne, an Australian football club
 FC Slavia Karlovy Vary, a Czech football club

Other uses
Slavia (band), a Norwegian black metal band
 , the faculty of Eastern European studies at Ghent University, Belgium
 Škoda Slavia, a subcompact sedan/saloon sold in India

See also
Slavija (disambiguation), for the Bosnian, Croatian, Macedonian, Serbian and Slovenian spelling
Sclavonia (disambiguation)